The 2005 Internationaux de Strasbourg was a women's tennis tournament played on outdoor clay courts. It was the 19th edition of the Internationaux de Strasbourg, and was part of the Tier III of the 2005 WTA Tour. The tournament took place at the Centre Sportif de Hautepierre in Strasbourg, France, from 16 May until 21 May 2005. Unseeded Anabel Medina Garrigues won the singles title and earned $27,000 first-prize money.

Finals

Singles

 Anabel Medina Garrigues defeated  Marta Domachowska, 6–4, 6–3

Doubles
 Rosa María Andrés /  Andreea Ehritt-Vanc defeated  Marta Domachowska /  Marlene Weingärtner, 6–3, 6–1

External links
 Official website
 ITF tournament edition details
 Tournament draws

Internationaux de Strasbourg
2005
Internationaux de Strasbourg
Internationaux de Strasbourg